Frances Potter may refer to:
Frances Potter (born 1974), member of Vanilla (band)
Frances Elizabeth Potter, the first woman in the UK to qualify as a pharmacist
Frances Squire Potter, American academic and activist